Revere may refer to:

Brands and companies
Revere Ware, a U.S. cookware brand owned by World Kitchen
 Revere Camera Company, American designer of cameras and tape recorders
Revere Copper Company
 ReVere, a car company recognised by the Classic Car Club of America
 LG Revere, a line of cellular flip phones

People
Anne Revere, U.S. film actress of the 1940s
Ben Revere, American baseball player in the Toronto Blue Jays organization
 Joseph Warren Revere (businessman), American businessman, son of Paul Revere
Joseph Warren Revere (general), Union general in the American Civil War, grandson of Paul Revere
Lawrence Revere, U.S. author and professional gambler
Paul Revere, U.S. Revolutionary War militia leader
Paul Revere Braniff, an airline entrepreneur

Places

Italy
Revere, Lombardy, a frazione of Borgo Mantovano in the province of Mantua

United States
Revere, Massachusetts, a city in Suffolk County, just outside Boston
Revere Beach, the first public beach in the United States
Revere Beach (MBTA station)
Revere, Minnesota, a city in Redwood County
Revere, Missouri, a village in Clark County

Other uses
Revere (band), a UK-based post-rock group
Revere (comics), a 2000 AD comic series by John Smith
Revere High School (disambiguation)
Revere Local School District, in Summit County, Ohio

See also
Mrs. Revere Stakes
Paul Revere (disambiguation)
Paul Revere's Ride
 Reverence (disambiguation)
 Reverend (disambiguation)